Dasht-e Bal (also Romanized as Dasht-e Bāl) is a village in Padena-ye Olya Rural District, Padena District, Semirom County, Isfahan Province, Iran. At the 2006 census, its population was 106, in 25 families.

References 

Populated places in Semirom County